Muhammad ibn Muslim ibn Ubaydullah ibn Abdullah ibn Shihab al-Zuhri (died 124 AH/741-2 CE), also referred to as Ibn Shihab or al-Zuhri, was a tabi'i Arab jurist and traditionist credited with pioneering the development of sīra-maghazi and hadith literature.

Raised in Medina, he studied hadith and maghazi under Medinese traditionists before rising to prominence at the Umayyad court, where he served in a number of religious and administrative positions. He transmitted several thousand hadith included in the six canonical Sunni hadith collections and his work on maghazi forms the basis of the extant biographies of Muhammad. His relationship with the Umayyads has been debated by both early and modern Sunnis, Shias and Western specialists in Islamic studies.

Biography

Early life and career 
Muhammad ibn Muslim al-Zuhri was born  in the city of Medina. His father Muslim was a supporter of the Zubayrids during the Second Fitna, while his great-grandfather Abdullah fought against Muhammad at the Battle of Uhud before converting to Islam.

Despite hailing from the Banu Zuhrah — a clan of Quraysh — Zuhri's early life was characterised by poverty, and he served as the breadwinner for his family. As a youth, Zuhri enjoyed studying poetry and genealogy, and possessed an excellent memory which enabled him in this pursuit. He consumed honey syrup in a bid to sharpen it further, and wrote voluminous notes on slates and parchment to aid with memory recall.

Dedicating himself to the study of hadith and maghazi narrations in his twenties, he studied under the Medinese scholars Said ibn al-Musayyib, Urwah ibn Zubayr, Ubayd-Allah ibn Abd-Allah and Abu Salamah, the son of Abd al-Rahman ibn Awf. He referred to them as four "oceans of knowledge". Using the traditions that were transmitted to him, Zuhri compiled a maghazi work of which fragments can be found in the writings of his students Ibn Ishaq and Ma'mar ibn Rashid. He may have been the first to combine multiple maghazi reports into one to produce a single, coherent narrative with collective chains of narration - a technique later used by Ishaq and Al-Waqidi.

Encounter with Abd al-Malik 
The caliph sought to prevent the Syrians from performing the Hajj in Mecca, which was controlled by the Zubayrids. Adducing a hadith from Zuhri that permitted pilgrimage to Jerusalem, Abd al-Malik ordered the construction of the Dome of the Rock to serve as a site for a substitute pilgrimage. 

Ignác Goldziher states that Zuhri fabricated the hadith at the behest of the caliph. However, the historicity of the encounter has been disputed by Muhammad Mustafa al-Azami, Nabia Abbott and Harald Motzki, as Zuhri was then a young and unknown figure, others also transmitted the hadith and his source Said ibn al-Musayyib would not consent to his name being used in a forgery.

Patronage by the Umayyads 
As his stature as a scholar grew, Zuhri came to the attention of the Umayyads.

Zuhri's study circle was praised by the deeply religious Umar II, who was engaged in scholarly pursuits in Medina. Upon his accession, he ordered prominent traditionists to commit their hadith to writing as part of his vision to codify the sunnah. Zuhri was tasked with compiling their manuscripts into books, copies of which were sent to cities throughout the caliphate. 

During the reign of Yazid II, Zuhri accepted an offer of judgeship from the caliph. He also served the Umayyads as a tax collector and as a member of the shurta. 

Hisham employed Zuhri as a tutor for his sons, permitting him to live at the court in Resafa. There, Hisham compelled Zuhri to write down hadith for the young Umayyad princes - a move that troubled the scholar, who was opposed to the practice. He later complained about the coercion, adding "Now that the rulers have written it [hadith], I am ashamed I do not write it for anyone else but them."<ref>Motzki 2004, p. 86, citing a narration found in Ibn Abd al-Barr's Jami''': "The rulers made me write [the tradition down] (istaktabani). Then I made them (i.e. the rulers' princes) copy it (fa-aktabu-hum). Now that the rulers have written it (i.e. the tradition), I am ashamed I do not write it for anyone else but them."</ref> Zuhri remained at Resafa for the next two decades, where he continued to teach new students and hold lectures in which he transmitted hadith.

 Retirement and death 
Toward the end of his life, Zuhri retired to an estate granted to him by the Umayyads in Shaghb wa-Bada, located on the border of the Hejaz and Palestine. He died from illness in 124 AH/741-2 CE. In his will, he designated the estate as sadaqah and requested to be buried in the middle of a nearby road so that passers-by could pray for him. His grave was visited by al-Husayn ibn al-Mutawakkil al-Asqalani, who described it as being raised and plastered with white gypsum.

 Students 
Alongside the casual attendees of his lectures, Zuhri taught at least two dozen regular students. These included:

 Ibn Ishaq 
 Malik ibn Anas 
 Sufyan ibn ʽUyaynah
 Uqail ibn Khalid
 Ma'mar ibn Rashid
 Yunus ibn Yazid al-Aili
 Muhammad ibn al-Walid al-Zubaidi
 Shu'aib ibn Dinar 

 Relationship with the Umayyads 

 Views of Zuhri's contemporaries 
Zuhri's attachment to the Umayyad court was negatively perceived by a number of his contemporaries. A statement attributed to Malik ibn Anas criticises Zuhri for using his religious knowledge for worldly gain, while Yaḥya ibn Maʻin forbade comparisons of him with al-A’mash as he "served in the administration of the Umayyads". Others defended his integrity: Amr ibn Dinar implied Zuhri had no desire to forge traditions for the Umayyads, even in exchange for bribes. Similarly, Abd al-Rahman al-Awza'i stated that Zuhri did not seek to appease the authorities. In addition, Ma'mar ibn Rashid quotes Zuhri as laughing at the Umayyads' claim that Uthman, a member of the Banu Umayya, signed the Treaty of Hudaybiyyah rather than Ali.

 Views of modern scholarship 
The exact nature of Zuhri's relationship with the Umayyads has been debated by modern scholars. In Goldziher's view, Zuhri was a pious scholar who was nonetheless compelled, if not willing, to forge traditions for them. In contrast, Muhammad Mustafa al-Azami and Abd al-Aziz Duri argue for the independence of Zuhri. They cite instances where he refused to falsely answer religious questions in a manner that would benefit the Umayyads, and an incident where he threatened to kill a young al-Walid II, who he tutored, for his bad manners. Michael Lecker argues against attempts to dissociate him from the Umayyads, but suggests he earned a degree of freedom within the court.

 Legacy 

 Influence on hadith and maghazi-sirah literature 
Zuhri's traditions and fiqh opinions were transmitted by his students and are included in Sunni hadith corpus. Zuhri is cited as an informant for approximately 3,500 narrations in the six canonical Sunni hadith collections. Malik ibn Anas refers to Zuhri for 21% of the traditions in his Muwatta, while Ma'mar ibn Rashid and Ibn Jurayj refer to Zuhri for 28% and 6% of the traditions in their respective corpora in the Musannaf of Abd al-Razzaq. Ma'mar and Ibn Ishaq, both students of Zuhri, rely heavily on their teacher's traditions in their respective prophetic biographies. Ma'mar's Kitab al-Maghazi relies heavily on maghazi traditions transmitted during Zuhri's lectures, as does Ibn Ishaq's Sirat Rasul Allah, although the latter also includes large amounts of material from popular storytellers and Biblical accounts. 

 Shia view 
Shia scholars specialising in biographical evaluation hold differing assessments of Zuhri. Due to his service for the Umayyads, Shaykh Tusi, Allamah Al-Hilli and Muhammad Baqir al-Majlisi considered him a Sunni and an enemy of the Ahl al-Bayt; the latter grading him as a da'if transmitter. Despite this, Tusi includes traditions from Zuhri in his collections Tahdhib al-Ahkam and Al-Istibsar. Abu al-Qasim al-Khoei and Muhammad Taqi Shushtari view Zuhri as a pro-Alid Sunni based on an account of him seeking the counsel of Ali ibn Husayn Zayn al-Abidin after accidentally killing a person. For the same reason, a third group, including Muhammad Taqi Majlisi, maintains Zuhri was a Shia and that his traditions are authentic (sahih).

Sunni view
Ibn Shihab al-Zuhri is regarded as one of the greatest Sunni authorities on Hadith. The leading critics of Hadith such as Ibn al-Madini, Ibn Hibban, Abu Hatim, Al-Dhahabi and Ibn Hajar al-Asqalani are all agreed upon his indisputable authority. He received ahadith from many Sahaba (Companions) and numerous scholars among the first and second generations after the Companions narrated from him.

On the other hand, in his famous letter to Malik ibn Anas, Laith ibn Sa`d writes:

Ibn Shihab would give many contradicting statements, when we would meet him. While if any one of us would ask him something in writing, he, in spite of being so learned, would give three contradictory answers to the same question. He would not even be aware of what he had said about the issue in the past. This is what prompted me to give up what you do not approve of [i.e. quoting a narrative on the authority of ibn Shihab].

Early Islamic scholars

 See also 

 Raja ibn Haywa
 Abu Bakr ibn Muhammad ibn Hazm

Notes

 References 

 Lecker, M. (2012), “al-Zuhrī”, Encyclopaedia of Islam, Second Edition, Edited by: P. Bearman, Th. Bianquis, C.E. Bosworth, E. van Donzel, W.P. Heinrichs.
 al-Azami, Muhammad Mustafa. (1978), Studies in Early Hadith Literature: with a critical edition of some early texts. Indiapolis, Indiana: American Trust Publications.
 Duri, A. (1957), "Al-Zuhrī: A Study on the Beginnings of History Writing in Islam". Bulletin of the School of Oriental and African Studies, University of London, 19(1), 1-12.
 Lecker, M. (1996), "Biographical notes on Ibn Shihab Al-Zuhri", Journal of Semitic Studies. 41. 21-63.
 Rāshid, Maʿmar ibn; Anthony, Sean W. (2015), The Expeditions: An Early Biography of Muhammad. Edited by Joseph E. Lowry, NYU Press.
 Goldziher, I. (1971), Muslim Studies, Vol. 2, edited by S. M. Stern and translated from German by C. R. Barber and S. M. Stern. London: Allen and Unwin.
 Abbott, N. (1957), Studies in Arabic Literary Papyri II: Qur'anic Commentary and Tradition. Chicago: University of Chicago Press.
 Görke, Andreas (2011), “The Relationship between Maghāzī and Ḥadīth in Early Islamic Scholarship.” Bulletin of the School of Oriental and African Studies, University of London, vol. 74, no. 2, 2011, pp. 171–185.
 Motzki, H., Boekhoff-van der Voort, N., & Anthony, S. W. (2009), Analysing Muslim Traditions. Leiden, The Netherlands: Brill.
 Vahidnia, F., Naqizadih, H., & Raisian, G. (2014), Shi‘a Rijali Views of Muhammad ibn Muslim ibn Shihab al-Zuhri. Journal of Shi'a Islamic Studies 7(1), 5-21.
 Motzki, H. (2004), Ḥadīth: Origins and developments.'' Routledge.

Further reading
 There is a modern discussion of al-Zuhri, his life, works and legacy in the eighth chapter of Azami's Studies in Early Hadith Literature: Mohmammad Mustafa Azmi "Studies in Early Hadith Literature: with a Critical Edition of Some Early texts" 1st edition 1968, 3rd edition 1992 used, American Trust Publications, .
 Boekhoff-van der Voort, Nicolet, Umayyad Court, in Muhammad in History, Thought, and Culture: An Encyclopedia of the Prophet of God (2 vols.), Edited by C. Fitzpatrick and A. Walker, Santa Barbara, ABC-CLIO, 2014, Vol. II, pp. 659–663.  (an entry on the Umayyad court and, in particular, the impact of Ibn Shihab al-Zuhri by a leading specialist on al-Zuhri)

External links
 Biodata at muslimscholars.info

677 births
724 deaths
7th-century Arabs
8th-century Arabs
Hadith compilers
Tabi‘un hadith narrators
Hadith scholars
Scholars from the Umayyad Caliphate
People from Medina
Banu Zuhrah